Arab is an unincorporated community in southern Bollinger County, Missouri, United States. It is located approximately four miles south of Zalma and 16 miles north of Puxico, at the intersection of Missouri Route 51 with routes C and P. Dexter lies about twenty miles to the south-suotheast. The community was founded in 1908 and receives its name from the city of Arab, Alabama.

Arab was originally located in Wayne County. In 1943, the post office and community were moved four miles away to extreme southern Bollinger County.

References

 Corbin, Paul, Reflections From Missouri Mud, Concord Publishing House, Inc., Cape Girardeau, Missouri, 2002.

Unincorporated communities in Bollinger County, Missouri
Cape Girardeau–Jackson metropolitan area
Unincorporated communities in Missouri